Zion Wright (born February 3, 1999) is a regular-footed American skateboarder. In 2019, Wright solidified himself as one of the newest generation's stars after being named a member of the USA Skateboarding Team.

Early life 
Wright grew up in Jupiter, Florida. He first started skateboarding at the age of 4 and quickly became a respected skateboarder in his home state of Florida. At the age of 16, Wright moved from his hometown to Los Angeles, California in hopes of advancing his skateboarding career. The move seemed to pay off as Wright went pro for Real Skateboards in November 2017.

Skateboarding career

Videos
In 2011, Wright had a part in Florida Daze by Mikey Glover, skating to Houdini by Foster The People. Wright also had parts in the 2013, Florida Daze 2 and the 2015, Florida Daze 3. In 2017, Wright had a part in the Thrasher - Am Scramble 2017 video and in the Real skateboards, By Any Means video.

Competitions
2018 - 1st Place: 2018 Vans Park Series Pro Tour - Huntington Beach, CA
2018 - 2nd Place: Simple Session - Tallinn, Estonia
2016 - 3rd Place: Tampa Am - Florida
2016 - 1st Place: PHXAM presented by Vans - Phoenix, AZ
2016 - 2nd Place: Boardr Am - Vista, CA
2015 - 1st Place: Harvest Jam Sponsored Finals - Tampa, FL
2015 - 5th Place: Damn Am Select Series New York City Finals - New York City, NY
2015 - 6th Place: Damn Am Costa Mesa Finals - Costa Mesa, CA
2014 - 1st Place: Harvest Jam Sponsored Finals - Tampa, FL
2014 - 1st Place: Back to School Bash Sponsored Finals

Sponsors 
As of March 2019, Wright is sponsored by Real, Vans, Red Bull, Thunder, Spitfire, Skatepark of Tampa (SPoT), Bones Bearings, Nixon, Shake Junt, Kreamy Wax, Hot Wheels, Glassy Sunhaters.

Wright is among the 16 members of the inaugural U.S.A Skateboarding National Team announced in March, 2019. As part of the team, Wright qualified for the 2020 Tokyo Olympic Games in the Men's Park division.

References

External links

Zion Wright at Skatepark of Tampa
Zion Wright at The Boardr

Zion Wright Isn't Worried About Skater of the Year at Vice

1999 births
Living people
African-American skateboarders
American skateboarders
People from Jupiter, Florida
Olympic skateboarders of the United States
Skateboarders at the 2020 Summer Olympics
X Games athletes
21st-century African-American sportspeople